Peter Fraser (1884–1950) was prime minister of New Zealand from 1940 to 1949.

Peter Fraser may also refer to:

 Peter Fraser (Northwest Territories politician) (1921–2000), Canadian politician
 Peter Fraser (merchant) (1765–1840), merchant and politician in New Brunswick
 Peter Fraser, Baron Fraser of Carmyllie (1945–2013), Scottish politician and advocate
 Peter Fraser (photographer) (born 1953), British photographer
 Peter Fraser (actor), Scottish actor
 Peter Fraser (classicist) (1918–2007), classical scholar
 Peter Gordon Fraser (1808–1888), Scottish public servant, later politician and artist in Van Diemen's Land
 Peter Fraser, fictional character on the Australian soap opera Home and Away
 Peter Fraser (judge), British barrister and judge
 Peter Fraser (writer) (1951–2014), editor of The Voice and writer of the musical Black Heroes in the Hall of Fame